South Sitra ( or ) is an island in Bahrain.

History
It is the location of Sitra Palace.

Geography
The Island is located just south of Sitra in the Persian Gulf. The island's western coast forms the boundary of Tubli Bay.
to the South of it is the new reclamation project of Sitra Technology Park Islands.

Transportation
The South Sitra Causeway connects it to Sitra Island.

Administration
The island belongs to Southern Governorate.

Image gallery

References

External links

Sitra
Islands of Bahrain
Islands of the Persian Gulf